Ballynure Old Boys Football Club, also known as Ballynure O.B., is an intermediate-level football club playing in the Premier division of the Ballymena & Provincial League in Northern Ireland. The club was founded in 1969. As well as the 1st team, the club also has 2nd team playing in the Junior Division 2 of the league. The club is based in Ballynure, County Antrim, but plays its home matches at Mossley Park, Carnmoney.

Honours

Intermediate honours
Ballymena & Provincial Intermediate League: 2
2007–08, 2014–15

References

External links
 Ballynure O.B. Official Club website
 nifootball.co.uk - (For fixtures, results and tables of all Northern Ireland amateur football leagues)

Association football clubs in Northern Ireland
Association football clubs established in 1969
Association football clubs in County Antrim
1969 establishments in Northern Ireland